Ciliopagurus hawaiiensis is a species of hermit crab native to Hawaii.

References

Hermit crabs
Crustaceans described in 1975